Richard Parry (1560–1623) was a Bishop of St Asaph and translator of the Bible to the Welsh language.

Parry was born in 1560, the son of John ap Harri, from Pwllhalog, Cwm, Flintshire, and Ruthin, and his wife, Elen ferch Dafydd ap John, a lady from Llanfair Dyffryn Clwyd, near Ruthin, North Wales. He was educated at Christ Church, Oxford.

He was ordained a deacon in 1584, and in May was instituted to a comportion of the tithes of Llanelidan and the endowment of Ruthin Free School where he became headmaster. His brother-in-law was the lexicologist, John Davies, who assisted him with the revision of the Welsh Bible and Book of Common Prayer

References

 The Royal Tribes of Wales - which is out of copyright.

Alumni of Christ Church, Oxford
1560 births
1623 deaths
Bishops of St Asaph
Translators of the Bible into Welsh
17th-century Welsh Anglican bishops
16th-century translators
17th-century translators
Welsh-language writers
Anglican biblical scholars
British biblical scholars
16th-century Anglican theologians
17th-century Anglican theologians